Skyworks Solutions, Inc. is empowering the wireless networking 
revolution. Our highly innovative analog and mixed-signal 
semiconductors are connecting people, places and things spanning 
a number of new and previously unimagined applications within 
the aerospace, automotive, broadband, cellular infrastructure, 
connected home, defense, entertainment and gaming, industrial, 
medical, smartphone, tablet and wearable markets.

Skyworks is a global company with engineering, marketing, 
operations, sales and support facilities located throughout Asia, 
Europe and North America and is a member of the S&P 500® 
market index (Nasdaq: SWKS).

On July 26, 2021, Skyworks announced that it completed its acquisition of the Infrastructure & Automotive business of Silicon Laboratories Inc. (Nasdaq: SLAB) in an all-cash asset transaction valued at $2.75 billion. 

On October 5, 2015, Skyworks Solutions entered a definitive agreement to acquire PMC-Sierra for $2 billion in cash.  However, Skyworks walked away from the deal, having been outbid by Microsemi. On April 22, 2021, Skyworks Solutions entered into a definitive agreement with Silicon Labs to acquire their Infrastructure & Automotive business for $2.75 billion.

See also

Comparison of open-source wireless drivers

References

External links

Fabless semiconductor companies
Semiconductor companies of the United States
Electronics companies established in 2002
2002 establishments in Massachusetts
Woburn, Massachusetts
Companies based in Irvine, California
Companies listed on the Nasdaq